Autogas for America claims to be the unified voice of the autogas industry in the United States. Composed of autogas experts, transportation industry specialists and environmental advocates, Autogas for America says it "leverages industry cooperation to widen recognition of autogas among the U.S. public, media and government."

Formed in 2010, the non-profit organization has grown to more than 100 stakeholders. Autogas for America does not favor any particular equipment manufacturer or fuel supplier, including stakeholders from both OEM manufacturers like Roush CleanTech, a subsidiary of Roush Performance, and after-market conversion providers like Alliance AutoGas.

Autogas for America's platform includes advocating the use of propane autogas as an alternative vehicle fuel. The organization markets autogas' application to public and private fleets. Among its goals, the organization's website says, "Autogas for America will pursue legislation that promotes the use of clean Autogas," to include the long-term extensions of the 50-cent-per-gallon alternative fuel tax credit and the 30%, up to $30,000, alternative fuel infrastructure credit that were renewed only through 2011 in. H.R. 4853.

References

External links 
 autogasforamerica.org

Lobbying in the United States
Organizations established in 2010
Engine fuel system technology
Fuel gas
Liquefied petroleum gas
2010 establishments in the United States